"Gotta Know (Your Name)" is a 1993 song by Malaika, released on A&M Records.

The composition was written by Eric Miller, Jamie Principle, Steve Hurley and Tommye Miller, and released as the second single from the singer's debut album Sugar Time. The single became a number #1 dance hit on the US Billboard Hot Dance Music/Club Play, and charted at number sixty-eight on the US R&B as well as in the UK Top 75.

Credits and personnel
 Malaika – lead vocals
 Eric Miller – writer
 Jamie Principle – writer
 Steve Hurley – writer, producer
 Tommye Miller – writer
 Todd Terry - additional producer, remix
 Davide Ruberto - additional producer, remix
 Gio - additional producer, remix
 Mark Lewis - additional producer, remix
 Maurice Joshua - remix
 Bill Katt - remix engineer

Track listings

 CD Maxi, UK, 580 273-2
 "Gotta Know (Your Name)" (7" Radio Mix) - 3:32
 "Gotta Know (Your Name)" (Gotta Know Mix) - 4:31
 "Gotta Know (Your Name)" (House Mix) - 5:17
 "Gotta Know (Your Name)" (Hip Hop Mix) - 4:04
 "Gotta Know (Your Name)" (Late Night Mix) - 6:50
 "Gotta Know (Your Name)" (Tribal Mix) - 6:04

 12" Maxi, UK, 580 273-1
 "Gotta Know (Your Name)" (LP Version) - 3:59
 "Gotta Know (Your Name)" (House Version) - 5:15
 "Gotta Know (Your Name)" (Hip Hop Mix) - 4:04
 "Gotta Know (Your Name)" (Vocal Remix) -
 "Gotta Know (Your Name)" (Late Night Mix) - 6:50
 "Gotta Know (Your Name)" (Tribal Mix) - 6:04

 12" Maxi, UK, Promo, AMYDJ 273
 "Gotta Know (Your Name)" (LP Version) - 3:59
 "Gotta Know (Your Name)" (Gotta Know Mix) - 4:31
 "Gotta Know (Your Name)" (Hip Hop Mix) - 4:04
 "Gotta Know (Your Name)" (House Version) - 5:15
 "Gotta Know (Your Name)" (Underground Jam) - 7:41
 "Gotta Know (Your Name)" (Rubber Dub) - 5:13

 12" Maxi, US, 31458 8135-1
 "Gotta Know (Your Name)" (House Version) - 5:15
 "Gotta Know (Your Name)" (Maurice's Mix) - 7:42
 "Gotta Know (Your Name)" (Dub Version) - 5:13
 "Gotta Know (Your Name)" (Rubber Dub) - 5:13
 "Gotta Know (Your Name)" (Oh My Instrumental) - 7:07
 "Gotta Know (Your Name)" (Underground Jam) - 7:41

 12" Maxi, US, 31458 0255-1
 "Gotta Know (Your Name)" (Gotta Know Mix) - 4:31
 "Gotta Know (Your Name)" (House Version) - 5:15
 "Gotta Know (Your Name)" (LP Version) - 3:59
 "Gotta Know (Your Name)" (Rubber Dub) - 5:13
 "Gotta Know (Your Name)" (Maurice's Mix) - 7:42
 "Gotta Know (Your Name)" (Underground Jam) - 7:41

 12" Maxi, US, Double, 31458 8135-1
 12" Maxi, US, Double, Promo, 31458 8135-1
 "Gotta Know (Your Name)" (Gotta Know Mix) - 4:31
 "Gotta Know (Your Name)" (CD Mix) - 4:30
 "Gotta Know (Your Name)" (LP Version) - 3:59
 "Gotta Know (Your Name)" (R&B Version) - 4:26
 "Gotta Know (Your Name)" (Hip Hop Mix) - 4:04
 "Gotta Know (Your Name)" (Instrumental) - 4:22
 "Gotta Know (Your Name)" (House Version) - 5:15
 "Gotta Know (Your Name)" (Maurice's Mix) - 7:42
 "Gotta Know (Your Name)" (Dub Version) - 5:13
 "Gotta Know (Your Name)" (Rubber Dub) - 5:13
 "Gotta Know (Your Name)" (Oh My Instrumental) - 7:07
 "Gotta Know (Your Name)" (Underground Jam) - 7:41

Charts

Peak chart positions

Year-end charts

See also
List of number-one dance singles of 1993 (U.S.)

References

External links
 

1993 songs
House music songs
Songs written by Steve "Silk" Hurley
Songs written by Jamie Principle
1993 singles
A&M Records singles
Songs written by Eric Miller (musician)